Afro Blue is a composition by Mongo Santamaría.

Afro Blue may also refer to:

 Afro Blue (Dee Dee Bridgewater album)
 Afro Blue (Harold Mabern album)
 Afro Blue (McCoy Tyner album)
 Afro Blue (choir), a Howard University jazz ensemble